Mangonia Park is a town in Palm Beach County, Florida, United States. It is a part of Uptown West Palm, which also includes Riviera Beach and West Palm Beach. The population was 1,888 at the 2010 census. As of 2018, the population recorded by the U.S. Census Bureau was 2,017.

History

The Town of Mangonia Park was established in 1947. The original petition to the State of Florida requested the name Town of Magnolia Park. The petition for incorporation was granted but under the name Town of Mangonia Park. An explanation accompanied the charter stating the name, Town of Magnolia Park, was already taken and the State of Florida took the liberty of naming the town with a similar name.

Government

It has a Town Manager-Town Council type of local government, with council members elected to five "at-large" seats that serve three year staggered terms. Municipal elections are held in March of each year by the Palm Beach County Supervisor of Elections Office.

Geography

Demographics

2020 census

As of the 2020 United States census, there were 2,142 people, 689 households, and 464 families residing in the town.

2000 census

As of the census of 2000, there were 1,283 people, 443 households, and 322 families residing in the town. The racial makeup of the town was 14.58% White (of which 12.2% were Non-Hispanic White,) 76.70% African American, 0.70% Native American, 0.31% Asian, 6.16% from other races, and 1.56% from two or more races. Hispanic or Latino of any race were 9.12% of the population.

There were 443 households, out of which 39.3% had children under the age of 18 living with them, 34.1% were married couples living together, 30.5% had a female householder with no husband present, and 27.3% were non-families. 17.8% of all households were made up of individuals, and 4.5% had someone living alone who was 65 years of age or older. The average household size was 2.90 and the average family size was 3.20.

In the town, the population was spread out, with 31.3% under the age of 18, 9.4% from 18 to 24, 31.3% from 25 to 44, 20.1% from 45 to 64, and 7.9% who were 65 years of age or older. The median age was 32 years. For every 100 females, there were 88.4 males. For every 100 females age 18 and over, there were 89.1 males.

The median income for a household in the town was $35,865, and the median income for a family was $34,688. Males had a median income of $21,083 versus $24,750 for females. The per capita income for the town was $14,864. About 16.7% of families and 19.2% of the population were below the poverty line, including 25.8% of those under age 18 and 21.1% of those age 65 or over.

As of 2000, speakers of English as a first language accounted for 80.47% of all residents, while Spanish comprised 11.04%, French Creole consisted of 7.61%, and the mother tongue of French made up 0.85% of the population.

As of 2000, Mangonia Park had the ninety-first highest percentage of black residents in the U.S., with 76.70% of the populace (tied with Hanley Hills, MO and Berkeley, MO.) It had the eighteenth highest percentage of Haitian residents in the U.S. at 9.10% of the town's population (tied with Lauderhill,) and the thirty-fourth highest percentage of Jamaican residents in the U.S. at 3.90% of its population (which tied with Redan, Georgia and Somerset, New Jersey.) It also had the twenty-seventh most Guatemalans in the U.S. at 3.82% of all residents.

Transportation

Mangonia Park is home to the Mangonia Park Station, the northern terminus of the Tri-Rail commuter rail system operated by SFRTA. It is also served by several bus routes operated by PalmTran, including Routes 20, 31, and 33.

References

External links
 Town of Mangonia Park Website
 YourNews.com - Mangonia Park Edition
 The Mangonia Park Flyer

Towns in Palm Beach County, Florida
Towns in Florida